Alfred Edwin Gay "Rosie" Dummett (8 December 1880 – 1 May 1955) was an Australian rules footballer who played for the Collingwood Football Club in the VFL during the early 1900s.

Family
The son of Henry Peter James Dummett (1857-1921), and Jessie Adeline Dummett (1856-1928), née Rouse, and known as "Rosie" due to his rosy red cheeks, Alf Dummett was born in Fitzroy on 8 December 1880.

He was the brother of Collingwood footballer Charlie Dummett (1891-1976), the brother of Victorian cricketer Arthur Dummett (1900-1968), and the uncle of Richmond footballer Bob Dummett.

Football
Dummett, a defender, was recruited locally to Collingwood.

He was a member of Collingwood's 1902 and 1903 premiership teams and captained the club for part of the 1906 season.

After football
After his playing career ended he served as the Vice President of the Collingwood Football Club.

He also served as Collingwood's delegate to the Victorian Football League for 30 years; and, in addition, served as the Victorian chairman of selectors from 1936 to 1952.

Death
He died in Parkville, Victoria on 1 May 1955.

Footnotes

References
 Holmesby, Russell and Main, Jim (2007). The Encyclopedia of AFL Footballers. 7th ed. Melbourne: Bas Publishing.
 Boot Manufacturers: Assignment of Property, The Age, (Tuesday, 21 December 1937), p.14.
 Shoe Company: Estate Assigned, The Argus, (Tuesday, 21 December 1937), p.9.

External links
 
 Biography: Alf Dummett.
 Boyles Football photos: Alf Dummett.
 Alf Dummett, at Collingwood Forever.

1880 births
1955 deaths
Collingwood Football Club players
Collingwood Football Club Premiership players
Australian rules footballers from Melbourne
Two-time VFL/AFL Premiership players
People from Fitzroy, Victoria
Collingwood Football Club administrators